Hoboken Shore Railroad , initials HSRR, was a New Jersey railroad which was created around 1954. It took over the activities of the Hoboken Manufacturers Railroad , initials HMRR. This railroad owned only  of mainline but leased about 1906 the longer route of the Hoboken Shore Road operated since 1897 by the Hoboken Railroad Warehouse and Steamship Connecting Company, initials HRRWH&SSConCo or HRRW&SSCCO.

It used electric operation till the 1930s and was abandoned in 1978, after the demise of the Hoboken Piers and decline of traffic.

History

Hoboken Shore Road 
In 1784 John Stevens purchased the land of today's city Hoboken from the State of New Jersey. After his death in 1838 his heritage was managed by the Hoboken Land and Improvement Company (HLIC), which held the subsidiary Hoboken Railroad Warehouse and Steamship Connecting Company (HRRWH&SSConCo) founded at September 17, 1895. The railroad began operation as Hoboken Shore Road on September 20, 1897.

Hoboken Manufacturers Railroad 
In 1902 the Hoboken Manufacturers Railroad (HMR) was incorporated. Its task was to extend the Hoboken Shore Road further South to connect with the DL&W in Jersey City, what never happened. The 1905 incorporated American Warehouse & Trading Company took control of the HMR. The less than a quarter mile long mainline of the HMR run from the end of the Hoboken Shore Road to the 1st Street and was opened about 1906. In the same year the HMR leased the railroad operation from the HRRWH&SSConCo for 99 years.

When the United States joined the Allies in World War I in the year 1917, the government seized all the piers and properties of German transatlantic shipping companies, namely the Hamburg America Line and the North German Lloyd. Furthermore, the Government bought all the shares of the American Warehouse & Trading Company for 2.45 Mil. $ on July 1, 1917 and therefore gained control over the HMR. After the war in the year 1924, it was discussed to sell the railroad to the Port Authority of New York and New Jersey, but it had not sufficient funds for the purchase. Therefore, it got sold in September 1927 to the Hoboken Railroad & Terminal Company owned by the Paul Chapman Company, which sold it in 1932 to Seatrain Lines.

Hoboken Shore Railroad 
After the death of Paul Chapman in 1954, the Hoboken Shore Railroad was created. Its 4000 shares were all owned by the HRRWH&SSConCo, which was owned by Webb and Knapp, but was up for sale. Traffic declines when industry and shipping in Hoboken closed or moved to other places. The railroad operated till 1977 and was officially abandoned 1978.

Road Description 
The Hoboken Shore Road built by Hoboken Railroad Warehouse and Steamship Connecting Company operated a 1.411 mile long main line, which started from the Erie yard in Weehawken and was running along the shore. The Northern end point was at 18th Street & Park Avenue, the Southern end point was at 5th Street & River Street. From the main line sidings branched of serving the local industry. At the 11th Street a car float transfer bridge was operated, which connected the railroad to the Delaware, Lackawanna and Western Railroad (DL&W). The total network had a length of 7.068 miles.

The Hoboken Manufacturers Railroad operated only 0.221 mile of main line and was therefore called the shortest railroad of US. It connected at 5th Street & River Street to the Hoboken Shore Road and continued South till 1st Street. Furthermore, it owned about 1.375 miles of yard tracks.

Operation 
The railroad started shortly after opening to traffic with the electric operation on January 6, 1898.

By 1911 the railroad had four electric locomotives in operation and switched in a daily 10-hour shift between 100 and 150 cars. Electric operation was ceased in the 1930s when the GE boxcab diesel locomotives arrived. 1938 brought an Alco HH660 series locomotive and 1947 two GE 44 ton switchers.

After World War II traffic declined. By 1954 the railroad had 38 employees and owned 2 shunting locomotives.

Roster

Hoboken Shore Road

Electric Locomotives

Snow Sweeper

Hoboken Manufacturers Railroad

Hoboken Shore Railroad 
Hoboken Shore Railroad continued to use the 44-ton switchers and also purchased an observation car.

See also 
 Timeline of Jersey City area railroads

Further reading

References 

Defunct New Jersey railroads
Switching and terminal railroads
Hoboken, New Jersey